Braham is a surname. Notable people with the surname include:

Bob Braham (1920–1974), Royal Air Force pilot
David Braham (1834–1905), British-born American musical theater composer (uncle of John Joseph Braham Sr.)
David Braham (football manager) from Cayman Islands
Edmund Braham (1860–1921), British-born American pianist, composer, and publisher
Hal Braham (1911–1994), American writer
Henry Braham (born 1965), British cinematographer
John Braham (tenor) (1774–1856), English opera singer
John Joseph Braham Sr. (1847–1919), British-born American musical theater composer (nephew of David Braham)
Leonora Braham (1853–1931), English opera singer
Loraine Braham (born 1938), Australian politician
Najeh Braham (born 1977), Tunisian football player
Philip Braham (1881–1934), British composer
Randolph L. Braham (1922–2018), political scientist
Rich Braham (born 1970), American football player
Richard Braham (c. 1613–1676), English politician who sat in the House of Commons from 1661 to 1676
Robert Braham (fl. 1555), English editor
Trevor Braham (1922–2020), British mountaineer

See also

 
 Braham (disambiguation)
 Brabham (surname)